Lands of Lore III is a 1999 action role-playing game developed by Westwood Studios and published by Electronic Arts. It is a sequel to Lands of Lore: Guardians of Destiny and the third game overall in the Lands of Lore video game series. The game set uses a first person perspective with a hack and slash combat system, and it features four "guilds" that the player may join to determine what quests the player will complete. Lands of Lore III was first announced in February 1998, and it received mixed reviews after release.

Gameplay
Set in a first person perspective, the game mechanics work as hack and slash when utilizing melee weapons. It uses many common elements of RPGs such as the guilds the player can join, having both weapons and magic attacks, and several portal worlds. There is an inventory screen, where the player can collect many weapons, armour and other items such as food. The leveling system works whereby using abilities enough will lead to levelling up in the guild that specialises in that particular ability, and higher levels unlock more skills.

Guilds
There are four guilds: a warriors' guild, a magicians' guild, a clerics' guild, and the illegal thieves' guild. Each one has its own set of quests to accomplish throughout the game, a familiar (a creature who accompanies and assists the player throughout the game), and a guild building containing shops, guild masters and sometimes training areas. The avatar, Copper, must join at least one, but has the option to join the others also.

Plot
The story takes place some time after Guardians of Destiny, and is based on the adventures of Copper LeGré, the son of Eric and fourth in the line of succession, whose uncle Richard rules the Lands. In the beginning of the game, Copper's father and two half brothers are slain by a dreadful rift hound, and Copper's own soul is torn from his body. As a result, Copper must not only retrieve his soul, but also settle the allegations now leveled against him as he was the only survivor. As the new sole heir to the Kingdom of Gladstone, many believe he orchestrated the whole incident with his father and brothers. Coupled with that is the fact that he is the result of an illicit affair between his father and a Dracoid barmaid—a half-breed heir. He must not only deal with those issues but also seek out answers to help close new rifts that have appeared throughout the Lands.

The story unfolds over many portal worlds in which Copper has to retrieve lost pieces of the Shining Path (which shattered when the Draracle left the Gladstone world). The same Draracle has sent Copper on his quest to save his life and soul as well as to save his home and world.

Development
The game was announced in February 1998.

Reception

The game received mixed reviews according to the review aggregation website GameRankings.

References

External links

1999 video games
Electronic Arts games
Fantasy video games
Role-playing video games
Single-player video games
Video games developed in the United States
Video games scored by Frank Klepacki
Westwood Studios games
Windows games
Windows-only games